The 2013 William Hill Greyhound Derby took place during May and June with the final being held on 29 June 2013 at Wimbledon Stadium.

Sidaz Jack rewarded trainer Charlie Lister OBE with an incredible seventh Derby title. The ante-post favorite Ballymac Eske had finished last in the semi-finals and was eliminated. The competition was sponsored by William Hill and the winner Sidaz Jack received £150,000.

Final result 
At Wimbledon (over 480 metres):

Distances 
1¼, short head, 1½, 1¾, 2½ (lengths)
The distances between the greyhounds are in finishing order and shown in lengths. One length is equal to 0.08 of one second.

Race Report
Ballymac Vic led to the second bend before being overtaken by Sidaz Jack and the two battled it out until Sidaz Jack gained an advantage. Airlie Impact ran on well for third place. Screen Critic and Droopys jet lost their chance after encountering trouble at the first bend and Bittles Bar made no impact.

Quarter finals

Semi finals

See also 
2013 UK & Ireland Greyhound Racing Year

References

External links 
Greyhound Board of Great Britain
Greyhound Data

Greyhound Derby
English Greyhound Derby
Grey
English Greyhound Derby
English Greyhound Derby